Cooked: Survival by Zipcode is a 2018 American documentary film, directed and produced by Judith Helfand. It follows the 1995 Chicago heat wave which resulted in the deaths of 739 people, primarily affecting poor and disadvantaged communities.

The film had its world premiere at DOC NYC on November 11, 2018. It was released through video on demand on August 28, 2019, by Journeyman Pictures, followed by a broadcast on Independent Lens on February 3, 2020.

Synopsis
The film follows the 1995 Chicago heat wave, resulting in the deaths of 739 people, primarily in poor and disadvantaged areas. Using this natural disaster as a jumping off point, the film reframes the politics of disaster arguing that disadvantaged communities should be treated as disasters taking place.

Release
The film had its world premiere at DOC NYC on November 11, 2018. It was released through video on demand on August 28, 2019, by Journeyman Pictures. It was broadcast on Independent Lens on February 3, 2020.

References

External links
 
 

2018 films
2018 documentary films
American documentary films
Documentary films about African Americans
Documentary films about natural disasters
PBS original programming
2010s English-language films
2010s American films